Francis Joseph Corrigan (born 13 November 1952 in Liverpool, Lancashire - now Merseyside) is an English former professional footballer who played as a midfielder. He spent the majority of his career at Wigan Athletic, for whom he was a regular starter in the club's inaugural season in the Football League.

References

External links

1952 births
Living people
English footballers
Association football midfielders
English Football League players
Blackpool F.C. players
Walsall F.C. players
Burton Albion F.C. players
Bangor City F.C. players
Northwich Victoria F.C. players
Wigan Athletic F.C. players
Footballers from Liverpool